Paul Holden may refer to:

Sportspeople
Paul Holden (ice hockey) in 1988–89 Los Angeles Kings season
Paul Holden (hurler) in Kilkenny Minor Hurling Team 2010

Others
Sir Paul Holden, 7th Baronet (born 1923) of the Holden baronets
Paul Holden (judge) in United States Court of Military Commission Review
Paul Holden (musician) from Southend (band)
Paul Eugene Holden (1893–1976), American mechanical engineer
P. J. Holden, comic artist